Coenosmilia is a genus of small corals in the family Caryophylliidae.

Species
The World Register of Marine Species includes the following species in the genus :
Coenosmilia arbuscula Pourtalès, 1874
Coenosmilia inordinata Cairns, 1984

References

Caryophylliidae
Scleractinia genera
Taxa named by Louis François de Pourtalès